Patriot Candrabhaga Stadium is a multi-purpose stadium located in Bekasi, West Java, Indonesia.  It is currently used mostly for association football matches. The stadium holds 30,000 people.

Patriot Stadium first built as Bekasi Stadium in 1980 with a capacity of only 5,000-10,000 spectators. Since 2011, the stadium is be upgraded into an international stadium. This international standard construction project costs amounted to 450 billion rupiah. Source of funding construction of the stadium itself comes from the Government of Bekasi gradually.

This roof stadium grandstand was made of zincalume metal and had a VIP grandstand which can accommodate up to 9,000 spectators and a parking deck which can accommodate thousands of cars and motorcycles. The inauguration ceremony of the stadium expansion was held in conjunction with the 17th anniversary of Bekasi on 10 March 2014.

The stadium currently used by Persipasi Bekasi. For the 2017 Liga 1, Bhayangkara F.C. and Persija Jakarta used this stadium for their home matches.

The stadium was used for the men's football tournament of the 2018 Asian Games, 2018 AFC U-19 Championship and the  2022 AFF U-19 Youth Championship.

International matches hosted

Tournament results

2018 Asian Games Men's Football

2018 AFC U-19 Championship

2022 AFF U-19 Youth Championship

Tournaments hosted
2018 Asian Games men's football
2018 AFC U-19 Championship
2022 AFF U-19 Youth Championship

Gallery

See also
 List of stadiums in Indonesia
 List of stadiums by capacity

References

Buildings and structures in West Java
Multi-purpose stadiums in Indonesia
Sports venues in Indonesia
Football venues in Indonesia
Rugby union stadiums in Indonesia
Sports venues in West Java
Multi-purpose stadiums in West Java
Football venues in West Java
Athletics (track and field) venues in West Java
Sports venues completed in 1980
Venues of the 2018 Asian Games
Asian Games football venues